William Harry McRaven (born November 6, 1955) is a retired United States Navy four-star admiral who served as the ninth commander of the United States Special Operations Command (SOCOM) from August 8, 2011 to August 28, 2014. From 2015 to 2018, he was the chancellor of The University of Texas System.

McRaven served from June 13, 2008 to August 2011 as commander of Joint Special Operations Command (JSOC) and from June 2006 to March 2008 as commander of Special Operations Command Europe (SOCEUR). In addition to his duties as COMSOCEUR, he was designated as the first director of the NATO Special Operations Forces Coordination Center (NSCC), where he was charged with enhancing the capabilities and inter-operability of all NATO Special Operations Forces. McRaven retired from the U.S. Navy on September 1, 2014, after more than 37 years of service.

McRaven was reportedly considered by President Joe Biden for appointment as Secretary of Defense before Biden nominated Lloyd Austin.

Early life
McRaven was born in Pinehurst, North Carolina. His father, a career Air Force officer, was stationed at Pope Air Force Base, now known as Pope Field, part of Fort Bragg. He has two older sisters. His family moved to Texas while he was in elementary school and settled in San Antonio. McRaven attended Theodore Roosevelt High School where he took part in track. He is the son of Anna Elizabeth (Long) and Col. Claude C. McRaven, a Spitfire fighter pilot in World War II who played briefly in the NFL.

McRaven attended the University of Texas at Austin where he was a walk-on member of the track team, and was a member of the Naval Reserve Officers Training Corps. He graduated in 1977 with a bachelor's degree in journalism, and was named a Distinguished Alumnus in 2012. McRaven holds a master's degree from the Naval Postgraduate School, where he helped establish and was the first graduate from the Special operations/Low intensity conflict curriculum.

Naval career

Special operations
After graduating from The University of Texas at Austin, McRaven was commissioned as an officer (Ensign) in the U.S. Navy and volunteered for Basic Underwater Demolition/SEAL training (BUD/S). After six months of training, McRaven graduated with BUD/S class 95 in January 1978. Following completion of a six-month probationary period, he received the 1130 designator as a Naval Special Warfare Officer, entitled to wear the Special Warfare insignia. As a Navy SEAL officer, McRaven was deployed to the Philippines with Naval Special Warfare Unit One in 1979 and 1981. In 1982, as a junior officer, McRaven received assignment to SEAL Team Six in Dam Neck, Virginia under the command of CDR Richard Marcinko and completed a specialized selection and training course. McRaven served as assault team leader but was relieved of duty in 1983 due to McRaven's concerns about military discipline, and difficulties in keeping his sailors in line at the command. Richard Marcinko fired the 27-year-old McRaven in 1983. "He was a bright guy, but he didn't like my rude and crude way," Marcinko said. "If I was a loose cannon, he was too rigid. He took the special out of special warfare." McRaven was transferred to another east coast based SEAL team. 
 
McRaven served numerous staff and command assignments within the special operations community, including platoon commander at Underwater Demolition Team 21/SEAL Team Four, squadron commander at Naval Special Warfare Development Group, executive officer of SEAL Team ONE, task unit commander during the Persian Gulf War, task group commander in the CENTCOM area of responsibility, commanding officer of SEAL Team THREE from 1994 to 1996, deputy commander for operations at JSOC, commanding officer of Naval Special Warfare Group ONE from 1999 to 2001. McRaven earned a Master of Arts degree at the Naval Postgraduate School in 1993. McRaven's thesis was titled "The Theory of Special Operations" (republished in 1995 as Spec Ops: Case Studies in Special Operations Warfare: Theory and Practice).

McRaven later served as a staff officer with an interagency coordination concentration, including as the director for Strategic Planning in the Office of Combating Terrorism on the National Security Council Staff, assessment director at U.S. Special Operations Command, on the Staff of the Chief of Naval Operations and the chief of staff at Naval Special Warfare Group 1.

McRaven was the deputy to General Stanley A. McChrystal and later leader of a battle group targeting Al Qaeda in Iraq called 'Task Force 714', which proved to be innovative and highly successful.

On April 6, 2011, McRaven was nominated by President Barack Obama for promotion from the rank of vice admiral to admiral and appointed as the ninth commander of USSOCOM, of which JSOC is a component.

In his confirmation hearings, McRaven "endorsed a steady manpower growth rate of 3% to 5% a year" and favored more resources for USSOCOM. After the Armed Services committee hearings, in late June, McRaven was confirmed unanimously by the Senate for his promotion to full Admiral and assignment as commander of USSOCOM and took command August 8. The transfer ceremony was led by Secretary of Defense Leon Panetta in Tampa, with ADM Eric T. Olson also in attendance, two days after the Wardak Province helicopter crash which cost 30 Americans, including 22 SEALs, their lives. With several hundred in attendance, Panetta spoke of sending "a strong message of American resolve [and] ... carry[ing] on the fight".

Operation Neptune's Spear
McRaven is credited for organizing and overseeing the execution of Operation Neptune's Spear, the special ops raid that led to the killing of Osama bin Laden on May 2, 2011. CIA Director Leon Panetta delegated operational & execution decisions on the raid to McRaven, who had worked almost exclusively on counter-terrorism operations and strategy since 2001.

According to The New York Times, "In February, Mr. Panetta called then-Vice Adm. William H. McRaven, commander of the Pentagon's Joint Special Operations Command, to CIA headquarters in Langley, Virginia, to give him details about the compound and to begin planning a military strike. Admiral McRaven, a veteran of the covert world who had written a book on American Special Operations, spent weeks working with the CIA on the operation, and came up with three options: a helicopter assault using U.S. Navy SEALs, a strike with B-2 bombers that would obliterate the compound, or a joint raid with Pakistani intelligence operatives who would be told about the mission hours before the launch." The day before the assault, President Obama "took a break from rehearsing for the White House Correspondents Dinner that night to call Admiral McRaven, to wish him luck".

A June 2013 Freedom of Information request revealed that on May 13, 2011, McRaven sent email titled "OPSEC Guidance / Neptune Spear" that instructed redacted recipients that "all photos [of UBL's remains] should have been turned over to the CIA; if you still have them destroy them immediately" or "get them to" a recipient whose identity was redacted.

In December 2011, McRaven was runner-up for Time Person of the Year for his role in the operation.

Retirement from the military
In June 2014, it was announced that Admiral McRaven had his request for retirement approved after a 37-year career. Admiral McRaven retired from the U.S. Navy on September 1, 2014. During the last few years of his career he was also Bull Frog, the longest serving Navy SEAL still on duty, having succeeded his SOCOM predecessor Eric T. Olson in the title.

The University of Texas Chancellor
Admiral McRaven was selected as the next chancellor of the University of Texas System in July 2014. He was appointed on January 5, 2015.

The Trump campaign transition team considered McRaven as a potential candidate for National Security Adviser.

On May 31, 2018, McRaven stepped down from his position as chancellor of the university, due to chronic health issues and a desire to spend more time with his family.

McRaven joined the board of the multinational ConocoPhillips, effective October 2018. 

McRaven spent $215M dollars on land in south Houston so that the UT system could expand. The land was a former chemical manufacturing site and was contaminated. The more than 300 acre parcel was formerly owned by another UT alumnus. McRaven sidestepped the Texas Legislature who should have been informed of the purchase at a time when funds for higher education have been cut. McRaven was also criticized for the unknown amount that would be needed remediate the soil of contaminates.

In 2022, McRaven joined the board of Palantir Technologies.

Disputes with President Trump

In August 2018, McRaven expressed support for former CIA Director John O. Brennan, whose security clearance had recently been revoked by the Trump Administration. He authored an open letter to President Donald Trump in The Washington Post entitled "Revoke my security clearance, too, Mr. President", in which he affirmed his regard for Brennan, his former colleague, and offered criticism of the decisions and personal behavior of President Trump. McRaven said of Brennan, "He is a man of unparalleled integrity, whose honesty and character have never been in question ... except by those who don't know him." Of Trump, McRaven wrote, "Through your actions, you have embarrassed us in the eyes of our children, humiliated us on the world stage and, worst of all, divided us as a nation."

In a November 18, 2018, interview on Fox News, Chris Wallace mentioned McRaven's name. Trump called McRaven a "Hillary Clinton fan" and accused McRaven of being a fan of former President Barack Obama. McRaven later told CNN, "I did not back Hillary Clinton or anyone else. I am a fan of President Obama and President George W. Bush, both of whom I worked for. I admire all presidents, regardless of their political party, who uphold the dignity of the office and who use that office to bring the nation together in challenging times." One media source noted that Trump's ire seemed to be rooted in "McRaven’s criticism that the president’s rhetoric toward the press is the 'greatest threat to democracy' in his lifetime".

On October 17, 2019, McRaven published an op-ed in The New York Times with the headline "Our Republic Is Under Attack From the President", arguing that if Trump did not demonstrate leadership, he was to be replaced. He elaborated his position in a CNN interview the same day, saying that Trump was undermining domestic institutions and damaging America's international standing, especially with respect to the treatment of the Kurds during the 2019 Turkish offensive into north-eastern Syria.

Upon the February 2020 dismissal by the president of Joseph Maguire for having briefed congressional intelligence committee members about emerging evidence of foreign efforts to interfere in the 2020 presidential election, McRaven authored a guest editorial in The Washington Post in which he declared that, "As Americans, we should be frightened — deeply afraid for the future of the nation. When good men and women can’t speak the truth, when facts are inconvenient, when integrity and character no longer matter, when presidential ego and self-preservation are more important than national security — then there is nothing left to stop the triumph of evil."

Personal life
McRaven is the son of a career Air Force officer. McRaven married Georgeann Brady, then a fellow undergraduate at the University of Texas at Austin, in 1978. They have three children.
McRaven attended the 2012 White House Correspondents' Association Dinner as the guest of his fifth grade classmate, Karen Tumulty.

Awards and decorations

Award ribbons and badges

Award and badge names

Additional awards
The Golden Plate Award of the American Academy of Achievement (2014) 
The Distinguished American Award (2016) 
The Texas Commandery of the Naval Order of the United States 2017 Nimitz Leadership Award
The Federal Law Enforcement Officers Association’s National Award
The National Intelligence Award

In media
 Dirty Wars, a 2013 American documentary, includes McRaven revisiting the site and survivors of the Khataba raid to apologize.
 His 2014 commencement address for the University of Texas at Austin received almost 60,000,000 views (as of Dec. 5, 2022) on YouTube. The speech has been particularly influential in modern culture, having been described as "inspiring" and with lots of wisdom to be found packed into the 20 minute speech.
 He was portrayed by Christopher Stanley in the 2012 film Zero Dark Thirty.
 McRaven was featured by Chris Wallace on Fox News Sunday in the segment "Power Player of the Week," September 5, 2021" on remembering those who served in the military embracing "the hero code", the subject and title of his new book.
 In 2021, the speech used in the song by Ben Gold & Allen Watts in trance music called "Change the World".

Books 


References

External links

 Admiral William H. McRaven, USN, Biography and Interview on American Academy of Achievement

|-

Living people
United States Navy personnel of the Gulf War
Naval Postgraduate School alumni
People from San Antonio
Killing of Osama bin Laden
Recipients of the Legion of Merit
Recipients of the Defense Superior Service Medal
Recipients of the Defense Distinguished Service Medal
United States Navy admirals
United States Navy SEALs personnel
United States Naval Special Warfare Command
Moody College of Communication alumni
Recipients of the Meritorious Service Medal (United States)
1955 births